Phoberocyon is a large extinct genus of hemicyonine bear, found primarily in North America during the Miocene. One species, P. hispanicus, is known from Miocene Spain.

Species
 Phoberocyon hispanicus Ginsburg & Morales, 1998
 Phoberocyon dehmi Ginsburg, 1955
 Phoberocyon aurelianensis Mayet, 1908
 Phoberocyon johnhenryi White, 1947
 Phoberocyon huerzeleri Ginsburg, 1955

References

Hemicyonids
Miocene carnivorans
Burdigalian extinctions
Prehistoric mammals of North America
Aquitanian genus first appearances
Fossil taxa described in 1955
Prehistoric carnivoran genera